LGBT-related films released in the 2010s are listed in the following articles:
 List of LGBT-related films of 2010
 List of LGBT-related films of 2011
 List of LGBT-related films of 2012
 List of LGBT-related films of 2013
 List of LGBT-related films of 2014
 List of LGBT-related films of 2015
 List of LGBT-related films of 2016
 List of LGBT-related films of 2017
 List of LGBT-related films of 2018
 List of LGBT-related films of 2019

 
2010s